Sílvio Name Júnior Regional Airport , is the airport serving Maringá, Brazil. It is named after Sílvio Name Júnior (1967-2000), a local businessman and politician who died in a plane crash.

It is operated by Terminais Aéreos de Maringá – SBMG, a semi-independent Transportation Authority of Maringá, indirectly related to the Municipality of Maringá, and under the supervision of Aeroportos do Paraná (SEIL).

History
The airport serves an area composed of the city of Maringá and neighboring communities, with a total number of 2 million inhabitants. The new terminal was built between October, 1994 and September 16, 2000. It began operating on April 25, 2001.

The airport is very modern and the runway of the airport is capable to handle major regional and domestic flights. Its terminal is designed to handle more than 430,000 passengers per year.

The airport has service with over 120 parking places.

Airlines and destinations

Access

See also

List of airports in Brazil

Gallery

References

External links

Maringá
Airports in Paraná (state)
Airports established in 2001